Charlotte "Lotten" Louise von Kræmer (6 August 1828, in Stockholm – 23 December 1912, in Stockholm) was a Swedish baroness, writer, poet, philanthropist and women's rights activist. She was the founder of the literary society Samfundet De Nio and, alongside Martina Bergman-Österberg, the main financier of the National Association for Women's Suffrage.

Biography 
Lotten von Kræmer was the daughter of the governor of Uppsala County, Baron  and Maria Charlotte (Lotten) Söderberg and the sister of the writer, scientist and politician Robert von Kraemer. She was raised in the governor's residence at the Uppsala Castle in Uppsala, and received private education from the professors of the Uppsala University.

She was a popular participator of the cultural and intellectual society life in Uppsala. Authors such as Geijer and Atterbom were acquainted with her parents, and Fredrika Bremer was a friend of her mother. She herself proved her talent in various artistic fields such as within literary evenings, dance during the balls and acting during the amateur theater, such as when she played the part of Jane Eyre, in which she was instructed by Elise Hwasser. In the summer of 1847, she visited Germany, Austria and Italy with her family. From 1847, however, her hearing slowly deteriorated as a consequence of scarlet fever, and she eventually became deaf. This ended her society life and affected her deeply. She was engaged to the conservative student Sten Johan Stenberg in 1855, but the engagement ended because of her deteriorating hearing and because he could not accept her radical ideas and her literary ambitions. She never married.

In 1880, her father died and she inherited a great fortune, which she is said to have managed very well. She moved to Stockholm, where she lived a more and more spartan life over the years and was regarded as an original. She spent a great deal of her fortune to finance various organisations of charity and reform of her choice.

Bibliography 
 Dikter, 1863
 Hemresan, song, 1864
 Fantasi-klängväxter kring verklighets stam, 1865
 Tankar i religiösa ämnen, 1866
 Strid''' svenskt original, 1869
 Ackorder (poems), 1870
 Bland skotska berg och sjöar, 1870
 "Tout pour la patrie"  (poems), 1872
 Nya dikter, 1882
 Felicia: svensk familjedram i tre akter, 1882
 Sånger och bilder, 1886
 En kämpande ande: religiösa dikter, 1886
 Florence Nightingale: poesi, 1886
 Poesiens vandring (illustrated by Jenny Nyström), 1888
 Karins bröllop, novel, 1890
 Hermes och Diotima: skådespel i fem akter, 1892
 Den kämpande anden: religiösa väckelser och religiöst liv: några sånger och tidsbilder, 1892
 Hägringar och luftslott (poems), 1895
 Skogsblommor: idyller och ballader (poems), 1896
 Eterneller (poems), 1896
 Två dikter, 1896
 Till Ingeborg och andra dikter, 1897
 Fama: skådespel i tre akter, 1902
 Fragment jämte andra dikter, 1902
 Nästa gång - : berättelser och skisser, 1902
 Testamente, 1913
 Samlade skrifter'' (published by Samfundet De Nio, with a biography by John Landquist), 1918

Sources 

 Charlotta (Lotten) L Kræmer, von, urn:sbl:11739, Svenskt biografiskt lexikon (art av Ragnar Amenius), hämtad 2014-07-16.

Further reading 
 

1828 births
1912 deaths
Swedish women poets
19th-century Swedish women writers
Swedish nobility
Swedish women's rights activists
19th-century Swedish poets
Swedish philanthropists
Writers from Stockholm
Burials at Uppsala old cemetery
Swedish suffragists
19th-century philanthropists
19th-century women philanthropists